Nik Kari (also Romanized as Nīk Karī; also known as Nekā Kāy and Nīkāgarī) is a village in Tula Rud Rural District, in the Central District of Talesh County, Gilan Province, Iran. At the 2006 census, its population was 1,434, in 326 families.

References 

Populated places in Talesh County